Bruce Maunder (May 14, 1934 – August 5, 2019) was a world leader in sorghum breeding and genetics who focused his career on finding solutions for global food security.

He started his career at Dekalb Genetics Inc. as their director of sorghum research and eventually became their Senior Vice President in 1991 and retired after 37 years in 1996. During his career, his plant breeding achievements meant that there were sorghum improvements around the world and an increase in agriculture production worldwide. His achievements in breeding included an estimated 150 commercial grain and forage hybrids that were grown on nearly 10 million acres of land in more than 20 countries.

National Boards 
He took on many leadership positions during his career including as the President of the Crop Science Society, Board member of t he Diversity magazine, Sorghum Crop Germplasm Committee of the USDA, Chair of the External Evaluation Panel for the US/AID INTSORMIL and others.

Honors 
Maunder received honorary doctoral degrees in science and agriculture from both Nebraska University (1991) and Purdue University (2003). He was a CSSA Fellow, an American Society of Agronomy Fellow, and the recipient of the Henry Beachell Distinguished Alumni Award. He also received the Monsanto Distinguished Career Award, the American Seed Trade Distinguished Service Award, and Agronomic Industry Award and others.

The Nebraska College of Agricultural Sciences and Natural Resources has a Maunder Borlaug Scholarship given out each year in honor of Bruce and Kathy Maunder. The National Sorghum Producers and the National Sorghum Foundation have established the Bruce Maunder Sorghum Leadership Scholarship as well.

References 

Plant geneticists
American geneticists
Purdue University alumni
1934 births
2019 deaths